Neil Inglis (born 10 September 1974) is a Scottish retired professional football goalkeeper who played in the Scottish League for a number of clubs, most notably Queen's Park, Berwick Rangers and Arbroath. After his retirement, he became a goalkeeping coach for Dunfermline Athletic.

Honours 
Linfield
 Irish League Cup: 1998–99
Queen's Park
 Scottish League Third Division: 1999–00
Ards
 Irish League First Division: 2000–01

References

External links 
 

Scottish footballers
Scottish Football League players
Association football goalkeepers
Queen's Park F.C. players
Living people
1974 births
Dunfermline Athletic F.C. non-playing staff
Soccerbase player ID not in Wikidata
Falkirk F.C. players
Greenock Morton F.C. players
Clydebank F.C. (1965) players
Linfield F.C. players
NIFL Premiership players
Ards F.C. players
Berwick Rangers F.C. players
Arbroath F.C. players
Bellshill Athletic F.C. players
Footballers from Glasgow
Scottish Junior Football Association players